Emily "Emy" Storey (born March 31, 1981) is a Montreal-based art director, graphic designer and illustrator. Born in Kinderhook, New York, Storey moved to Montreal to study Design Art at Concordia University, where she received her Fine Arts degree in 2003.
Storey's company, Storey Elementary, produces graphic and website design, develops logos, ads, promotional items, band merchandise and album art for clients that include Showtime, Atlantic Records, Warner Music Group, Sanctuary Records, Vapor Records, Maverick Records and Superclose Music. 
Storey has also designed limited edition shoes for DC Shoes and Macbeth Footwear.
Storey has worked with several non-profit organizations as an organizer and as a graphic designer. She is co-founder of Revel and Riot, an LGBT organization.

Album art 
 Death Cab for Cutie -Codes and Keys
 Death Cab for Cutie -Narrow Stairs
 Death Cab for Cutie -Cath...
 Death Cab for Cutie -The Open Door EP
 Tegan and Sara - So Jealous
 Tegan and Sara - The Con
 Tegan and Sara - Sainthood
 Tegan and Sara - Heartthrob 
 The Rentals - The Last Little Life EP
 The Inevitable Backlash - Sex for Safety
 The Reason - Things Couldn't Be Better
 Melissa Ferrick - In The Eyes Of Strangers
 Rachael Cantu - Run All Night

Clients 
 Death Cab for Cutie
 Paramore
 Tegan and Sara
 The Tragically Hip
 First Aid Kit
 The Rentals
 Augustana
 Liam Lynch
 Melissa Ferrick
 DC Shoes
 Soundscreen Design
 Yellow Bird Project

References

External links 
 EE Storey's website
 Revel and Riot

American graphic designers
American illustrators
American LGBT artists
Living people
1981 births
Concordia University alumni
21st-century LGBT people